Mountain Township is one of twenty-five townships in Barry County, Missouri, United States. As of the 2000 census, its population was 299.

Mountain Township was organized in 1846, and named for the hilly terrain within its borders.

Geography
It contains two cemeteries: Carney and Doughty.

The stream of Carney Creek runs through this township.

References

 USGS Geographic Names Information System (GNIS)

External links
 US-Counties.com
 City-Data.com

Townships in Barry County, Missouri
Townships in Missouri